Melquíades Fundora Dina (born 20 March 1926) is a Cuban charanga bandleader and flautist. He formed his charanga band La Sublime in 1957. He was born in Nueva Paz, near Havana.

References

1926 births
Possibly living people
Cuban flautists
Cuban charanga musicians
Cuban bandleaders